Jay Armstrong Johnson (born September 1, 1987) is an American actor, singer, and dancer, known for his portrayal of Will Olsen in the ABC television series Quantico and starring roles on Broadway in musicals, including Parade, On the Town, and The Phantom of the Opera.

Early life
Johnson was born on September 1, 1987, in Fort Worth, Texas. At the age of thirteen, he made his professional debut in the touring production of Cathy Rigby's Peter Pan. Johnson attended New York University's Steinhardt School of Music, where he appeared in a 2008 production of composer Adam Guettel and librettist Tina Landau's musical Floyd Collins, working directly with the composer. Johnson departed NYU before his senior year to play the role of Mark in the national tour of the Broadway revival of A Chorus Line.

Career

Theatre
After joining the American national tour of A Chorus Line in the role of Mark, Johnson made his Broadway debut in the 2009 revival of Hair, as a Member of the Tribe and principal understudy for Gavin Creel in the leading role of Claude. Directed by Diane Paulus, the production won the 2009 Tony Award for Best Revival of a Musical. In 2010, he played Jack Kelly in one of the first readings of the musical Newsies.

In 2011, Johnson appeared in the original Broadway cast of the musical Catch Me If You Can as standby for the leading role of Frank Abagnale, played by Aaron Tveit. Johnson returned to Broadway in 2013, playing Greg Wilhote in the original cast of the musical Hands on a Hardbody.

In 2014, Johnson starred in the Lincoln Center and New York Philharmonic production of Stephen Sondheim's musical Sweeney Todd. In a New York Times review of the production, directed by Lonny Price, critic Charles Isherwood praised Johnson's performance.

From 2014 to 2015, Johnson starred as Chip in the Broadway revival of Leonard Bernstein, Betty Comden, and Adolph Green's On the Town, directed by John Rando at the Lyric Theatre. For his performance, Johnson received Astaire Award and Clive Barnes Award nominations.

In 2017, Johnson starred in the New York City Opera production of Leonard Bernstein's Candide, directed by Harold Prince. As the title character, he garnered acclaim for his performance.

In February 2018, Johnson appeared in the world premiere of Fire and Air, the final play by Tony Award-winner Terrence McNally, at Classic Stage Company. Johnson played Léonide Massine. The production was directed by Tony Award-winner John Doyle.

Johnson joined the Broadway company of The Phantom of the Opera on April 30, 2018, in the role of Raoul, Vicomte de Chagny, again directed by Harold Prince. Johnson played the role for over a year, departing September 3, 2019. During his run in Phantom, Johnson appeared in New York City Center's 75th Anniversary gala presentation of A Chorus Line, this time in the role of Bobby. The production, which recreated Michael Bennett's original Broadway production, was directed by Bob Avian and choreographed by Baayork Lee, and ran for seven performances at City Center in November 2018.

After departing Phantom in 2019, Johnson reunited with director Lonny Price in the world premiere of Adam Gwon and Michael Mitnick's musical Scotland, PA (based on the film of the same name) at Roundabout Theatre Company. For his performance as Banko (a version of Macbeth's Banquo), Johnson received nominations for the Drama Desk Award for Outstanding Featured Actor in a Musical and Lucille Lortel Award for Outstanding Featured Actor in a Musical. Johnson received an honor from the Outer Critics Circle Awards for Outstanding Featured Actor in a Musical for his performance.

In early 2020, Johnson returned to Lincoln Center's David Geffen Hall in a 50th anniversary presentation of Andrew Lloyd Webber's Joseph and the Amazing Technicolor Dreamcoat. Johnson played Reuben in the one-night-only event directed by Michael Arden and produced by Manhattan Concert Productions. Johnson appeared again in 2020 with Roundabout Theatre Company in the New York premiere of the musical Darling Grenadine, written by Daniel Zaitchik and directed by Michael Berresse. Laura Collins-Hughes, writing in The New York Times, praised Johnson's "fine acting" in the production.  

In 2022, Johnson appeared as Curtis in the world premiere Second Stage Theatre production of To My Girls, a play written by JC Lee and directed by Stephen Brackett.

In the fourth quarter of 2022, Johnson appeared in the New York City Center Gala production of Jason Robert Brown and Alfred Uhry's musical Parade, directed by Michael Arden. Johnson played "sensationalist reporter" Britt Craig in a performance The New York Times called "superb". Johnson was set to reprise his role in the Broadway production, opening at the Bernard B. Jacobs Theatre, on March 16, 2023.

Concerts and recordings
In 2016, Johnson performed in a series of concerts at New York's 54 Below, featuring over a dozen musicians and guest appearances from other vocalists. Stephen Holden, reviewing the show in The New York Times, praised Johnson's vocal performance, stating, "He has the gift." Later that year, Broadway Records released an album of the concert, recorded live, entitled Jay Armstrong Johnson – Live at Feinstein's / 54 Below.

Johnson appeared on Todrick Hall's visual album Straight Outta Oz, released in 2016. He performed the song "Color", a duet with Hall.

In March 2017, Johnson made his Carnegie Hall debut with Michael Feinstein's Standard Time with Michael Feinstein. Johnson appeared again at Carnegie Hall in April 2017 in a MasterVoices production of Babes in Toyland.

Since 2016, Johnson has produced and starred in an annual Halloween-themed fundraiser, a musical parody of the beloved Disney film Hocus Pocus that has featured appearances by Broadway performers. The 2019 event, entitled I Put a Spell on You: The Return of the Sanderson Sisters, was held at New York's (Le) Poisson Rouge venue.

Television
In 2016, Johnson was cast in the recurring role of FBI recruit, Dr. Will Olsen, on the ABC thriller television series Quantico. He appeared as Olsen in all three seasons of the series.

Personal life

Johnson is gay.

Awards and nominations
In 2013, Johnson won a Drama Desk Award as part of the ensemble of Prospect Theatre Company's production of Working.

In 2020, Johnson received Lucille Lortel Award and Drama Desk Award nominations for his performance as Banko in Roundabout Theatre Company's production of Scotland, PA, a musical based on the film of the same name.

Filmography

Film

Television

Theatre

References

External links
 
 

1987 births
21st-century American male actors
American male film actors
American male television actors
American gay actors
Living people
Male actors from Texas
LGBT people from Texas